A papal conclave is a meeting of the College of Cardinals to elect the Pope of the Roman Catholic Church.

Conclave may also refer to:

 ConClave (convention), an annual science fiction convention in Michigan, US
 Conclave (novel), a 2016 novel by Robert Harris
 Conclave (film), a 2023 film based on the novel
 The Conclave, a 2006 Canadian/German film